St. Michael's Church was a Roman Catholic and later Church of Ireland church which was located in High Street, Dublin, Ireland.

The church

A chapel was originally erected by Donat, Archbishop of Dublin, in 1076, which was converted into a parish church by Archbishop Richard Talbot in 1417. It was used by the Corporation of Shoe-makers, a guild. It was situated in High Street, at the corner of Christ Church lane, immediately opposite the western end of the cathedral, where the former Synod Hall now stands. In 1554 St. Michael's was one of three Prebends in Christ Church set up by Archbishop Browne.

For a number of years, it fell into ruin, but was rebuilt in 1815, when Dr. Graves, Dean of Armagh, was Prebendary. It was mostly demolished (except the tower) by George Edmund Street later in the 19th century during his restoration of Christ Church Cathedral. The tower has been incorporated into the Synod Hall.

The parish
Around 1850 it contained 1,317 inhabitants.

Notable parishioners
Daniel Wytter (rector 1662–1664), who became Bishop of Dromore
Gabriel Jacques Maturin (rector 1734–35)
Edward Ledwich (rector 1749–1761, not the antiquary of the same name, who was born in 1739 across the road in Nicholas St.), who became Archdeacon of Kildare and Prebendary of Christ Church.

Thomas Taylour, 1st Marquess of Headfort, founder of the Bective family, who worked with William Petty in compiling the Down Survey of Ireland, was interred here in 1682. It was also the burial place of the Fielding family, ancestors to the Earls of Desmond. Ford Lambart, 5th Earl of Cavan, was interred here in 1772.

References and sources
Notes

Sources

Former churches in the Republic of Ireland
Church of Ireland churches in Dublin (city)